Richard Jackson Barnet (May 7, 1929 – December 23, 2004) was an American scholar who co-founded the Institute for Policy Studies.

Early years
Born in Boston, Richard Barnet was raised in Brookline. After attending The Roxbury Latin School, he graduated from Harvard University in 1951 and from Harvard Law School in 1954. After serving two years in the U.S. Army, he worked as a lawyer in Boston. In 1959, he became a fellow at Harvard's Russian Research Center (renamed in 1996 the Davis Center for Russian and Eurasian Studies).

Government service
After publishing his first book, Who Wants Disarmament? (1960), a study of U.S.-Soviet disarmament negotiations, Barnet joined the State Department in 1961 as an aide to John J. McCloy in the U.S. Arms Control and Disarmament Agency.

Institute for Policy Studies
Disillusioned by his experience of the inner workings of government, Barnet left government service in 1963 to co-found, with Marcus Raskin, the Institute for Policy Studies (IPS). He served as its co-director until 1978, and remained active at the institute he had helped create until his retirement in 1998.  IPS was the first influential political think tank according to Sidney Blumenthal, who said that the structure of IPS served as a model for the ideologically antagonistic Heritage Foundation.

From 1969, Barnet was a member of the Council on Foreign Relations foreign policy organization.

Author
 
Richard Barnet wrote Roots of War (1972), Global Reach: The Power of the Multinational Corporations (1974), one of the first books critical of the effects of what would come to be known as globalization, Lean Years (1980), an account of the environmental movement and Global Dreams (1994), an analysis of some powerful corporations. He also wrote, with his wife, Ann, Youngest Minds: Parenting and Genes in the Development of Intellect and Emotion (1998).

Barnet often contributed to The New Yorker, Harper's, The Nation and Sojourners Magazine, among other publications.

Personal life
Barnet was strongly religious, which influenced his views about war, peace and civil rights. He was a talented violinist, and taught music to children from poor neighborhoods toward the end his life. He and his wife, Ann, had two daughters and one son, as well as a foster son. He died at age 75 in December 2004.

Works
 Intervention and Revolution; the United States in the Third World, 1968 
 The Economy of Death, 1969 
 Roots of War: The Men and Institutions behind U.S. Foreign Policy, 1972
 The Giants: Russia and America, 1977
 Real Security: Restoring American Power in a Dangerous Decade, 1981
 The Rockets' Red Glare: when America goes to War : the Presidents and the People, 1990
 The Lean Years: Politics in the Age of Scarcity, 1982
 The Alliance - America, Europe, Japan: Makers of the Postwar World, 1983

References

External links

1929 births
2004 deaths
American political writers
American male non-fiction writers
American male violinists
People from Boston
People from Brookline, Massachusetts
Harvard Law School alumni
20th-century American violinists
Roxbury Latin School alumni
20th-century American male musicians
20th-century American male writers
Harvard College alumni